Gopher Dunes is a Sand Track Facility in the community of Courtland in Norfolk County, Ontario, Canada. The Owner, Derek Schuster is well known amongst the Motocross Community for creating a welcoming, friends and family oriented facility that many enjoy spending their time at during the Spring and Summer months.

Summary
Gopher Dunes is internationally renowned for being one of the toughest tracks in Ontario. The main feature of Gopher Dunes is their world famous 2km sand track, along with 5 other tracks and 3 off-road trail systems that are specifically made for dirt bikes, all-terrain vehicle and side-by-side (vehicle)

Facility Information
Their famous 2km Main Track features man-made obstacles with a 40 rider starting gate and underground irrigation system. The track is groomed 4 days per week and irrigated 3 days per week (if applicable). The Corner track was built to give riders a spot to work on practicing their cornering skills which as most racers know, is the most crucial skill set to have. The track features a wide variety of soil including clay, wood chips, dark loam, and sand. Next up, the Peewee track at Gopher Dunes is 1.3 kilometers in length and is designed for 50cc/65cc two-strokes along with up to 150cc 4-stroke bikes and race quads up to 110cc. This is a great course for kids who want to get the full track riding experience. Lastly, Gopher Dunes trail system offers 3 separate one-directional trails that are close to 10km each in length for bikes, ATV’s, and UTV’s. The trails are well marked and groomed several times per year, offering something fun to ride from Beginner to Pro. Single track sections for bikes only and a Mud trail for ATV’s and UTV’s only are featured in the trail systems. 

Aside from their well established tracks and trails, Gopher Dunes is well known for it's highly recommended 2 hour Red Rider and Off-Road Rider lessons; offered to beginner and newly-experienced riders that want to learn the sport and improve their skills. Overnight camping and yearly memberships are available all season long for those that wish to spend their summer at the Dunes. Fishing and Swimming is also available to everyone at the facility.

Dirt bikes are most commonly seen on the track as recreational biking is encouraged Tuesday to Sunday during the open season, along with organized racing - Triple Crown Series, AMO Racing, Thames Valley Riders. Rider CMRC Pro National races are scheduled races done by the organized motorsports leagues for the purpose of racing their respective seasons. It is considered one of the most difficult tracks on the national tour.

References

Sports venues completed in 1987
Motocross racing venues in Canada
Buildings and structures in Norfolk County, Ontario
Sports venues in Ontario
Tourist attractions in Norfolk County, Ontario
1987 establishments in Ontario